Siyanda Xulu  (born 30 December 1991) is a South African professional soccer player who plays as a centre-back for Turan Tovuz and the South Africa national team.

Club career
Xulu was born in Durban. During his formative years, he spent time in the Kaizer Chiefs academy before being released in 2009 whereafter he joined Mamelodi Sundowns.

In May 2010 Xulu was offered a trial by Barcelona, before having a two-week trial with Arsenal in September 2010, which he also failed to do enough to win a contract.

In September 2012 Xulu joined Russian Premier League side FC Rostov, signing a four-year contract. At Rostov, Zulu won the Russian Cup of the 2013–14 footballing season.

He was released by Maritzburg United at the end of the 2019–20 season.

On 29 July 2020, Xulu signed for Israeli Premier League club Hapoel Tel Aviv.

International career
Xulu made his debut for the South Africa national team on 15 June 2012 in the match against Gabon, he substituted Morgan Gould at the 80th minute. On 28 May 2018, he was named captain for the nation's 2018 COSAFA Cup campaign.

Career statistics

Club

International
.

Scores and results list South Africa's goal tally first, score column indicates score after each Xulu goal.

Honours
Rostov
Russian Cup: 2013–14

Notes

References

External links

1991 births
Living people
Sportspeople from Durban
South African soccer players
Association football defenders
Mamelodi Sundowns F.C. players
Kaizer Chiefs F.C. players
FC Rostov players
Maritzburg United F.C. players
Hapoel Tel Aviv F.C. players
South Africa international soccer players
Russian Premier League players
Israeli Premier League players
South African expatriate soccer players
Expatriate footballers in Russia
Expatriate footballers in Israel
South African expatriate sportspeople in Russia
South African expatriate sportspeople in Israel